Jud Süß is a 1925 historical novel by Lion Feuchtwanger based on the life of Joseph Süß Oppenheimer.

Historical background
Joseph Süß Oppenheimer was an 18th-century Court Jew in the employ of Duke Karl Alexander of Württemberg in Stuttgart. In the course of his work for the duke, Oppenheimer made a number of powerful enemies, some of whom conspired to bring about his arrest and execution after Karl Alexander's death.

The story of Joseph Süß Oppenheimer had been the subject of a number of literary and dramatic treatments over the course of more than a century; the earliest of these having been Wilhelm Hauff's 1827 novella.  The most successful literary adaptation was the Feuchtwanger novel based on a play that he had written in 1916 but subsequently withdrew. The novel was translated into English by Willa and Edwin Muir.
In the afterword to the novel, Feuchtwanger characterized Hauff's novella as 'naïvely anti-Semitic.'

Feuchtwanger's themes
For Feuchtwanger, Süß was a forerunner that symbolized the evolution in European philosophy and cultural mentality, representing a shift towards Eastern philosophy, from Nietzsche to Buddha, from "the old to the new covenant."  Karl Leydecker writes:

For Feuchtwanger, Jud Süß was primarily a novel of ideas, dealing with a number of philosophical oppositions such as vita activa versus vita contemplativa, outer versus inner life, appearance versus essence, power versus wisdom, the pursuit of one's desires vs. the denial of desires, Nietzsche vs. Buddha.

Plot
The novel tells the story of a Jewish businessman, Joseph Süß Oppenheimer, who, because of his exceptional talent for finance and politics, becomes the top advisor for the Duke of Württemberg. Surrounded by jealous and hateful enemies, Süß helps the Duke create a corrupt state that brings them immense wealth and power.

In the meantime, Süß discovers he is the illegitimate son of a respected nobleman, but decides to continue living as a Jew, as he is proud of having achieved such a position despite this. Meanwhile, the Duke finds out about Süß's hidden daughter and, trying to rape her, accidentally kills her. Süß is devastated.  He plans and executes his revenge. He encourages and then exposes the Duke's plan to overthrow the Parliament, thus infuriating the Duke to death, Subsequently, Süß realizes nothing will bring back his daughter, and apathetically turns himself over to authorities. Accused of: fraud, embezzlement, treason, lecherous relations with the court ladies and accepting bribes, he is adjudicated.  Under the pressure of the public, the court sentences him to death by hanging. Despite being given a last chance for reprieve if he reveals his noble origins or converts to Christianity, he dies reciting the Shema Yisrael, the most important prayer in Judaism.

Adaptations
Ashley Dukes and Paul Kornfeld also wrote dramatic adaptations of the Feuchtwanger novel. Orson Welles made his stage debut (at the Gate Theatre, on October 13, 1931) in Dukes' adaptation, as Duke Karl Alexander of Württemberg. In 1934, Lothar Mendes directed a film adaptation of the novel starring Conrad Veidt.

In Nazi Germany, Joseph Goebbels forced Veit Harlan to direct a virulently anti-Semitic film to counter the philo-semitism of Feuchtwanger's novel and Mendes' adaption of it. Harlan's film violated almost everything about the novel's characters and its sentiments. In the Harlan film, Süß rapes a Gentile German girl and tortures her father and fiancé before being put to death for his crimes.

In Feuchtwanger's play and novel, Josef Süß Oppenheimer emerges as a father and his fictional daughter Tamar (play)/Naemi (novel) provides both an ideal centre and turning point of the narrative. In Harlan's Nazi film, the central female figure Dorothea Sturm (played by Kristina Söderbaum) is, again, represented as ideal. However, her violation and subsequent suicide transform Josef Süß Oppenheimer's execution (historically a miscarriage of justice) into a symbol of the judicial court's true righteousness that is hailed by the masses. Like a negative image, the film is a total inversion of Feuchtwanger's narrative as it mirrors the literary texts’ central elements in reverse; Lion Feuchtwanger's depiction of Josef Süß Oppenheimer's journey from a power-hungry financial and political genius to a more enlightened human being is turned into an anti-Semitic propaganda piece.

References

External links 
 Ausstellung Jud Süß - Geschichten einer Figur 
 Zur Wirkungsmacht der 'ikonischen Figur' „Jud Süß“ (Tagungsbericht)
 Lion Feuchtwanger: Jud Süss (1925) von Gabrielle Oberhänsli-Widmer

1925 German-language novels
German historical novels
German novels adapted into films
Biographical novels
Fiction set in the 18th century
Novels set in Germany
Jewish novels